Wien Haidestraße is a railway station serving Simmering, the eleventh district of Vienna.

Services 
 the following services stop at Wien Haidestraße:

References

External links 
 
 

Railway stations in Vienna
Austrian Federal Railways